Modou Sarr (born 12 May 1994) is a Gambian football midfielder who plays for Gamtel.

References

1994 births
Living people
Gambian footballers
The Gambia international footballers
Gamtel FC players
Association football midfielders